Géza Lakatos de Csíkszentsimon (Hungarian title/name: "Vitéz lófő csíkszentsimoni Lakatos Géza"; in German: Geza Ritter Lakatos, Edler von Csikszentsimon) (30 April 1890 – 21 May 1967) was a colonel general in the Hungarian Army during World War II who served briefly as Prime Minister of Hungary, under governor Miklós Horthy from 29 August 1944, until 15 October 1944.

Biography 
Lakatos graduated at Ludovica Military Academy. He was a military attaché in Prague from 1928 to 1934. On 5 August 1943 he succeeded vitéz Gusztáv Jány as commander of the Second Army. On 1 April 1944 he was appointed commander of the 1st Hungarian Army, but this was only until 15 May 1944.

In August 1944 supporters of Lakatos and Horthy, armed with one tank, overthrew the German-installed government of Döme Sztójay. Lakatos's military government stopped the deportation of Hungarian Jews, with acting Interior Minister Béla Horváth ordering Hungarian gendarmes to use deadly force against any deportation effort. Lakatos also reopened peace talks with the Allies that had previously been begun by Miklós Kállay.  He even went as far as to begin talks with the Soviets.  On 15 October 1944, Horthy tried to force the Germans out entirely and concluded an armistice with the Allies.  However, when Horthy announced this in a nationwide radio address, the Germans kidnapped Horthy's son, Miklós Horthy, Jr., and Horthy surrendered to them. The far-right Arrow Cross Party, backed by the Germans, immediately staged a coup and took full control of the government. Lakatos was forced to resign that day, and was imprisoned by the Germans in Sopronkőhida. After that he was interned into Sopron.

Following the Soviet occupation of Hungary, Lakatos was interrogated several times in Kiskőrös. He was released from prison in January 1946 and thereafter appeared as a witness in war crime trials against the Arrow Cross Party and other pro-Nazi former officials before the so-called People's Tribunal of Budapest. In the forthcoming years he lived in his estate in Érd. His military pension was revoked by the Communist authorities and his lands were also confiscated in 1949. Following that he moved to Budapest where he worked as a book illustrator and silk painter, and lived in poor financial circumstances. His daughter emigrated to Australia in 1956, when the failed Hungarian Revolution briefly allowed people to emigrate from Hungary. Following his wife's death in 1965, the authorities permitted Lakatos to travel to Adelaide where his daughter lived since 1957. He died there a decade later, in 1967.

References 

 
 C A Macartney: October Fifteenth – A History of Modern Hungary, 1929–1945, 2 vols, Edinburgh University Press 1956-7.
 Lakatos Géza: Ahogyan én láttam, Budapest, Európa, 1992.
 Géza Lakatos: As I saw it: the tragedy of Hungary, Englewood, N.J. : Universe Publishing, 1993.
 Ignác Romsics: Hungary in the Twentieth Century, Budapest: Corvina, 1999.

External links 
 Generals.dk
  

1890 births
1967 deaths
Military personnel from Budapest
Prime Ministers of Hungary
Hungarian generals
Austro-Hungarian military personnel of World War I
Hungarian people of World War II
Hungarian military personnel of World War II
World War II political leaders
Hungarian emigrants to Australia
Recipients of the Knight's Cross of the Iron Cross
Hungarian expatriates in Czechoslovakia
Hungarian twins
Heads of government who were later imprisoned
Politicians from Budapest